Ghosts & Heartaches is the second extended play by Australian singer songwriter Conrad Sewell, featuring two tracks "Come Clean" and "Healing Hands". The EP was released on 18 May 2018 Sales of Ghosts & Heartaches counted towards the song "Healing Hands".

Sewell told Billboard the songs are about him evolving: "I've been on the road for two years with Kygo and different people and been trying to figure myself out and my sound...and along with that comes a lot of change within yourself."

Upon release, Sewell said: "I was with a girl that I loved so much she made me want to stop partying the way I did, but, I didn't. The whole situation was driving me crazy at the time and the words poured out in the studio. It opened the gates to the rawer lyrics that seeped into the new stuff."

Sewell performed "Healing Hands" on The Voice Australia on 10 June 2018.

Reception
Bryan Kress from Billboard said "The songs display a vulnerable yet resilient side to Sewell, exhibited by his powerful vocals and confessional lyrics."

Track listing

Release history

References

2018 EPs
EPs by Australian artists